The Daniel Pennock Democracy School teaches citizens and activists how to use democratic processes through people's constitutional rights to confront corporate wrongdoing (such as by opposing toxic dumps, quarries, factory farms, etc.). In addition it explores the limits of conventional regulatory organizing and offers a new organizing model that helps citizens confront the usurpation by corporations of the rights of communities, people, and the earth.

It is dedicated to the memory of Daniel Pennock, a 17-year-old boy from Berks County, Pennsylvania, who died in 1995 after being exposed involuntarily to land applied sewage sludge.

References 
 Derber, Charles, Corporation Nation: How Corporations Are Taking Over Our Lives -- And What We Can Do about It, St. Martin's Press, 1998. 
 Estes, Ralph W., & Ralph Nader, Taking Back the Corporation: A Mad as Hell Guide. 
 Nace, Ted, Gangs of America: The Rise of Corporate Power and the Disabling of Democracy, Barrett-Koehler, 2005. 
 Ritz, Dean (ed.), Defying Corporations, Defining Democracy: A Book of History & Strategies.

External links 
 Daniel Pennock Democracy School

Anti-corporate activism